Burnt Lips is an album by American guitarist Leo Kottke, released in 1978. It peaked at #143 on the Billboard Pop Albums charts.

History
Burnt Lips includes two selections from the soundtrack of Terrence Malick's film Days of Heaven. Only one is heard in the movie; an abbreviation of "The Train and the Gate." The album was recorded by Kottke in his home using Sound 80 Studio's mobile recording unit.

Although Kottke did not release an album in 1977, he produced and played on The Wylie Butler by Cal Hand (Takoma TAK C-1056), a Minneapolis pedal steel and dobro player who had played on numerous Capitol releases for Leo.

Reception

Writing for Allmusic, music critic Mark Allen wrote of the album "The subjects of death and betrayal permeate this understandably dark album... His always problematic singing assumes a prominent role, which might not be the best strategy. He showcases his string wizardry on 'A Dull [sic] Thud' and several other instrumentals."

Track listing
All songs by Leo Kottke except as noted.

Side one
 "Endless Sleep" (Nick Lowe) – 3:37
 "Cool Water" (Bob Nolan) – 2:25
 "Frank Forgets" – 2:09
 "Sonora's Death Row" (Kevin Blackie Farrell) – 4:30
 "The Quiet Man" – 2:05
 "Everybody Lies" – 2:19
 "I Called Back" – 2:38

Side two

 "A Low Thud" – 3:07
 ""Orange Room" – 3:33
 "The Credits: Out-takes from Terry's Movie" – 3:46
 "Voluntary Target – 2:58
 "Burnt Lips" – 2:07
 "Sand Street" – 1:46
 "The Train and the Gate: From Terry's Movie" – 3:18

Charts

Personnel
Leo Kottke—acoustic guitar, vocals
Production notes:
Produced by Leo Kottke
Recorded with Sound 80’s remote
Engineered by Jeff Roberts, Tom Mudge and Scott Rivard
Photo and Design—John Van Hamersveld

References

External links
 Leo Kottke's official site
 Unofficial Leo Kottke web site (fan site)

1978 albums
Leo Kottke albums
Chrysalis Records albums